

Laguna de Marfil or Baía Grande is a lake in Mato Grosso, Brazil and José Miguel de Velasco Province, Santa Cruz Department, Bolivia. Located at an elevation of 246 m, its surface area is 97.5 km2.

Lakes of Brazil
Bolivia–Brazil border
International lakes of South America
Landforms of Mato Grosso
Lakes of Santa Cruz Department (Bolivia)